The Lockheed XF-90 was built in response to a United States Air Force requirement for a long-range penetration fighter and bomber escort. The same requirement produced the McDonnell XF-88 Voodoo. Lockheed received a contract for two prototype XP-90s (redesignated XF-90 in 1948). The design was developed by Willis Hawkins and the Skunk Works team under Kelly Johnson. Two prototypes were built (s/n 46-687 and -688). Developmental and political difficulties delayed the first flight until 3 June 1949, with Chief Test Pilot Tony LeVier at the controls. Embodying the experience gained in developing the P-80 Shooting Star, the XF-90 shared some design traits with the older Lockheed fighter, albeit with swept-wings; however, this latter design choice could not sufficiently make up for the project’s underpowered engines, and the XF-90 never entered production.

Design and development
In response to a 1945 Army request for an advanced jet fighter, Lockheed proposed a jet powered initially by a Lockheed L-1000 axial flow turbojet, and then the General Electric J35. Further design refinements included using two Westinghouse J34 engines with afterburners. After data showed that a delta planform would not be suitable, the Lockheed Model 90 was built in 1947 as a mock-up.

The final design embodied much of the experience and shared the intake and low-wing layout of the previous P-80 Shooting Star, but with 35° swept-back wings, a sharply-pointed nose, and two Westinghouse J34-WE-11 axial-flow turbojet engines, providing a total thrust of 6,200 lbf (27.6 kN), mounted side-by-side in the rear fuselage and fed by side-mounted air intakes. The wings had leading edge slats, Fowler flaps, and ailerons on the trailing edge. The pressurized cockpit was fitted with an ejection seat and a bubble canopy. Proposed armament was six 20  mm (.79 in) cannons. The internal fuel was supplemented by wingtip-mounted tanks, bringing total fuel capacity to 1,665 gal (6,308 L). The use of 75ST aluminum rather than the then-standard 24ST aluminum alloy, along with heavy forgings and machined parts, resulted in a well-constructed, sturdy airframe. These innovations resulted in an aircraft with an empty weight more than 50% heavier than its competitors.

The first XF-90 used non-afterburning J34s, but these lacked the thrust for takeoff as rocket-assisted RATO were required for most of the first flights unless it carried a very low fuel load. The second (XF-90A) had afterburners installed which had been tested on an F-80 testbed. Even so, the aircraft remained underpowered.

Testing and evaluation

The XF-90 was the first USAF jet with an afterburner and the first Lockheed jet to fly supersonic, albeit in a dive. It also incorporated an unusual vertical stabilizer that could be moved fore and aft for horizontal stabilizer adjustment. Partly because Lockheed's design proved underpowered, it placed second to McDonnell's XF-88 Voodoo which won the production contract in September 1950, before the penetration fighter project was abandoned altogether.

Upon Lockheed losing the production contract, the two prototypes were retired to other testing roles. The first aircraft (46-687) was shipped to the NACA Laboratory in Cleveland, Ohio in 1953 for structural tests. It was no longer flyable, and its extremely strong airframe was tested to destruction. The other (46-688) survived three atomic blasts at Frenchman Flat within the Nevada Test Site in 1952.

Notable appearances in media
The XF-90 lived on as the jet fighter aircraft flown by the popular Blackhawks Squadron in the comic book series of the same name, first published by Quality Comics and later by DC Comics. The Blackhawks flew fictional "B" and later "C" models all through the 1950s until 1964. Both were improved, single engine production variants of the original twin-engine Lockheed XF-90.

Aircraft disposition
46-0687 – tested to destruction at NACA lab in Cleveland, Ohio.
46-0688 – in storage, awaiting restoration at the National Museum of the United States Air Force in Dayton, Ohio. In 2003, the heavily damaged hulk was recovered from the Nevada Test Site and moved there. It is currently undergoing minor restoration in one of the Museum's restoration facility hangars. Its wings have been removed, and its nose was mangled by the nuclear blasts. During the decontamination process, all rivets were removed to purge radioactive sand. The aircraft is now on display in the museum's Cold War gallery in a diorama depicting it on the Nevada Test Site.

Specifications (XF-90A)

See also

References

Notes

Bibliography

 Boyne, Walter J. Beyond the Horizons: The Lockheed Story. New York: St. Martin's Press, 1998. .
 Greenberger, Robert. "Blackhawk". In Dougall, Alastair. The DC Comics Encyclopedia. London: Dorling Kindersley, 2008. .
 Jenkins, Dennis R. and Tony R. Landis. Experimental & Prototype U.S. Air Force Jet Fighters. North Branch, Minnesota: Specialty Press, 2008. .
 Jones, Lloyd S. U.S. Fighters: Army-Air Force 1925 to 1980s. Fallbrook, California: Aero Publishers Inc., 1975. .
 Knaack, Marcelle Size. Encyclopedia of US Air Force Aircraft and Missile Systems: Volume 1 Post-World War II Fighters 1945–1973. Washington, DC: Office of Air Force History, 1978. .
 O'Leary, Michael, ed. "Deep Penetration", America's Forgotten Wings, Volume 1, 1994.
 Pace, Steve. Lockheed Skunk Works. St. Paul, Minnesota: Motorbooks International, 1992. .
 Pace, Steve. X-Fighters: USAF Experimental and Prototype Fighters, XP-59 to YF-23. St. Paul, Minnesota: Motorbooks International, 1991. .
 Simone, William J. Lockheed XF-90 Penetration Fighter, Air Force Legends 222. Simi Valley, California, Steve Ginter, 2020. .

External links

 USAF Museum: XF-90
 Operation Tumbler-Snapper: Atomic Blast Testing

F-090
Lockheed F-90
Twinjets
Low-wing aircraft